Air Marshal Sujeet Pushpakar Dharkar, PVSM, AVSM is an officer in the Indian Air Force. He is currently serving as the Air Officer Commanding-in-Chief, Eastern Air Command. He assumed the office on 1 October 2022. Previously, he served as the Senior Air Staff Officer of South Western Air Command, Gandhinagar.

Early life and education
Sujeet Pushpakar Dharkar is a graduate of Defence Services Staff College, Wellington and an alumnus of the prestigious National Defence Academy, Khadagwasla. He is an alumnus of Rashtriya Indian Military College, Dehradun and USAF Air War College, Montgomery.

He has instructional experience in conducting Professional Military Education for medium and senior level officers at the Defence Services Staff College and at the College of Air Warfare, Secunderabad.

Career
Sujeet Pushpakar Dharkar was commissioned as a fighter pilot in the Indian Air Force on 14 June 1985. He has flying experience of over 3,600 hours on a variety of fighter aircraft.

Air Marshal SP Dharkar is a Qualified Flying Instructor, Fighter Strike Leader and Instrument Rating Instructor & Examiner and has also been an Air Force Examiner. During his illustrious career, he has commanded a front line fighter squadron and a Fighter Flying Training Establishment and has also instructional experience in conducting Professional Military Education at the DSSC and at the College of Air Warfare, Secunderabad.

He has significant experience in ground attack / strike roles, predominantly on the MiG-23 and MiG-27 aircraft.

As an Air Vice Marshal, he served as the first Director General of the Defence Space Agency.

As an Air Marshal, he served as the Senior Air Staff Officer (SASO) of South Western Air Command from 1 November 2021 till 30 September 2022.

He assumed the charge of  Air Officer Commanding-in-Chief, Eastern Air Command on 1 October 2022 succeeding Air Marshal Dilip Kumar Patnaik.

Honours and decorations 
During his career, Sujeet Pushpakar Dharkar has been awarded the Ati Vishisht Seva Medal in 2014 and Param Vishisht Seva Medal in 2023.

References 

Indian Air Force air marshals
Recipients of the Ati Vishisht Seva Medal
Year of birth missing (living people)
Living people
Defence Services Staff College alumni
Academic staff of the Defence Services Staff College